Tirukalukundram taluk or Thirukalukundram taluk is a taluk of Chengalpattu district of the Indian state of Tamil Nadu. The sacred town, Tirukalukundram is the present taluk headquarters. Formerly, the headquarters of the taluk was the town of Chengalpattu, which is a now a Taluk head of the newly formed namesake Taluk.

Demographics
According to the 2011 census, the taluk of Tirukalukundram had a population of 196,807 with 99,381  males and 97,426 females. There were 980 women for every 1000 men. The taluk had a literacy rate of 70.91. Child population in the age group below 6 was 10,102 Males and 9,866 Females.

History
This taluk was earlier, a part of the Kanchipuram district until the district was bifurcated and a new Chengalpattu district was created. It is famous for mara sekku machine oil like kadalai ennai, nallaennai and many types of oil with moderate cost for buying. famous snacks item like poondu mixture, karasev and karaboonthi, munthiri pakoda are at moderate cost for buying. tharpoosani is famous in summer season for buying at moderate cost in road side.

Administration
The taluk is administered by the Tahsildar office located in Tirukalukundram.

References 

Taluks of Chengalpattu district